During the 21st Canadian Parliament, the number of sitting women senators increased. Eleven women ran for seats in the Canadian House of Commons in the 1949 federal election; none were elected. However, Ellen Fairclough, who had run unsuccessfully in the Hamilton West riding as a Progressive Conservative, was elected in a May 1950 by-election held after the incumbent was appointed to the Ontario Supreme Court.

Cairine Wilson and Iva Campbell Fallis continued to sit as members of the Senate. In May 1953, Muriel McQueen Fergusson and Marianna Beauchamp Jodoin were named to the Canadian senate, bringing the total number of women senators to four.

Party Standings

Members of the House of Commons

Senators

References 

Lists of women politicians in Canada